Vanessa Lillo Gómez (born 10 March 1983) is a Spanish politician. Since 11 June 2019, she has been a member of the Assembly of Madrid.

References 

1983 births
Living people
People from Madrid
21st-century Spanish women politicians
Members of the 10th Assembly of Madrid